Velour, occasionally velours, is a plush, knitted fabric or textile similar to velvet or velveteen. It is usually made from cotton, but can also be made from synthetic materials such as polyester. Often, it contains a percentage of elastane, for comfort and durability. Velour is used in a wide variety of applications, including clothing and upholstery.

Velour can also refer to a rough natural leather sometimes called velour leather. Chrome tanned leather is ground from the inside, which forms a delicate, soft layer on the surface. It is used for footwear, clothing, and upholstery. This type of leather is often confused with velvet suede and chamois.

Uses
Velour can be a woven or a knitted fabric, allowing it to stretch. It combines the stretchy properties of knits with the rich appearance and feel of velvet.  Velour is used in dance wear for the ease of movement it affords, and is also popular for warm, colorful, casual clothing. When used as upholstery, velour often is substituted for velvet.

The velour widely used in the manufacture of theater drapes and stage curtains is manufactured using the same weaving process as velvet: two sets of warps and wefts woven at the same time, with additional threads that will become the nap in between, then cut apart to produce the two separate tufted fabrics. Cotton velours used for this range from 16oz per linear yard to 32oz per linear yard, synthetic versions typically run 13oz to 32oz per linear yard.

Velour also has uses in the cleaning industry, most notably on vacuum attachments to help capture debris.

See also
Velveteen
Duvetyne
Rep (fabric)

References

External links
 

Knitted fabrics